Nameless Gangster: Rules of the Time (literally: "War on Crime: The Golden Age of the Bad Guys") is a 2012 South Korean gangster film directed by Yoon Jong-bin starring Choi Min-sik and Ha Jung-woo. The film is set in the 1980s and ’90s in Busan when corruption and crime was so rampant that the government declared war on it in 1990.

Time praised the film, calling it "the Korean mob film Martin Scorsese would be proud of."

Plot 
South Korea, 13 October 1990. Following President Roh Tae-woo's declaration of a crackdown on organized crime, Busan businessman Choi Ik-hyun (Choi Min-sik) is arrested for embezzling billions of won from hotel construction companies, and is also charged with intimidation, kidnapping and assault. Busan public prosecutor Jo Beom-seok (Kwak Do-won) is in charge of the investigation, and especially the murder of hotel owner Heo Sam-shik (Kwon Tae-won) by mobster Kim Pan-ho (Cho Jin-woong), with whom Ik-hyun allegedly was connected.

Back in March 1982, Choi was a Busan customs officer who, along with colleagues, was already taking bribes and pilfering goods. After discovering 10 kilograms of hiropon (crystal meth) in a warehouse one night, he and colleague Mr. Jang (Kim Jong-soo) approach a friend of Jang's, gangster Choi Hyung-bae (Ha Jung-woo), to sell it to Japan's yakuza, with whom Hyung-bae has ties. Ik-hyun discovers that the younger Hyung-bae is also a member of the same Choi family clan from Gyeongju and the two form a close relationship. Ik-hyun leaves his customs job and becomes a full-time businessman, with Hyung-bae taking care of the underworld side and Ik-hyun protecting him with his high-level contacts.

In the mid-'80s the two forcibly take over a nightclub run by Miss Yeo (Kim Hye-eun) that is on the turf of Pan-ho. Following his humiliation, Pan-ho has the club raided by the police and Hyung-bae arrested, though Ik-hyun gets Hyung-bae released by using the Choi clan connection with Seoul public prosecutor Choi Joo-dong (Kim Eung-soo). In May 1987, Ik-hyun and Hyung-bae take their business to the next level, formally linking up with Japan's Yakuza and having a connection with a hotel-casino, the Daedong, that is also on Pan-ho's turf. Pan-ho puts a hit out on Hyung-bae and Ik-hyun and threatens a gang war, and Ik-hyun is forced to decide where his loyalties and self-survival lie.

Out of desperation, Ik-hyun meets up with Pan-ho without Hyung-bae's knowledge to solve the issues between the two gangs, and one of Pan-ho's men tries to kill Hyung-bae shortly after. A paranoid Hyung-bae, who has become increasingly annoyed by Ik-hyun trying to overpower him, has Ik-Hyun beaten up and kicked out of the gang with a stern warning. When Ik-hyun is arrested by the prosecutor, he finally reveals all his connections to the underworld in order to save himself. However, he seemingly only reveals the whereabouts of Pan-ho, who has been hiding away from the authorities. In order to survive, Hyung-bae reconciles with Ik-hyun and they plan to escape together after Ik-hyun has his family sent away to America. However, as they are escaping Busan, the authorities catch up to them. It turns out that Ik-hyun had revealed Hyung-bae's whereabouts as well and has been playing him all along. Hyung-bae tries to kill Ik-hyun out of frustration but he is arrested and taken away. The prosecutor is given an award by the president for bringing down organized crime in Busan.

Twenty years later, Ik-hyun's son is now a law graduate from Seoul University and has joined the prosecutor's office. Despite having escaped the law and living a life of luxury, Ik-hyun is still suffering from guilt over how he betrayed Hyung-bae. While Ik-hyun is celebrating his first grandson's birthday with the rest of the family, Hyung-bae's voice is heard. Ik-hyun turns to face the camera and the screen turns to black.

Cast 

 Choi Min-sik as Choi Ik-hyun
 Ha Jung-woo as Choi Hyung-bae, a gang boss
 Cho Jin-woong as Kim Pan-ho, a gang boss
 Kwak Do-won as Jo Beom-seok, a public prosecutor
 Ma Dong-seok as Mr. Kim, brother-in-law of Ik-hyun
 Kim Sung-kyun as Park Chang-woo, Hyung-bae's gang underboss
 Kim Jong-goo as Jo Bong-goo, a customs chief officer
 Kim Jong-soo  as Mr. Jang, a customs officer
 Kwon Tae-won as Heo Sam-shik, co-owner of the nightclub
 Kim Hye-eun as Miss Yeo, co-owner of the nightclub
 Kim Eung-soo as Choi Joo-dong, a public prosecutor
 Song Young-chang as Mr. Han, a lawyer
 Takeshi Nakajima as Jaidoku Ganeyama, a yakuza boss
 Lee Cheol-min as Hyung-bae's gang member
 Go In-beom as Choi Moo-il, Hyung-bae's father
 Kim Young-sun as wife of Ik-hyun
 Lee Ji-ha as Bag carrier
 Park Byung-eun as adult Choi Joo-han, son of Ik-hyun

Production 
Choi Min-sik reportedly put on 10 kilograms for his role and Ha Jung-woo spent 8 hours putting on the fake body tattoos featured in the film.

Soundtrack 

The film's soundtrack was released on February 20, 2012. Jo Yeong-wook, whose credits include Thirst, Oldboy, and Public Enemy, served as the music director, and composed 22 score tracks. Also included was an old K-pop song that was reflective of the era in which the film is set, "I Heard a Rumor", which was originally sung by 1980s rock band Hahm Joong-ah and the Yankees. The cover version sung by rock band Jang Ki-ha and the Faces played during the end credits sequence of the film, and was released on January 13, 2012 as a single.

Track listing 
 War on Crime Part 1 (범죄와의 전쟁 Part 1) – 2:33
 Year 1982 (1982년) – 2:28
 Ourselves (우리끼리) – 1:55
 Thugs (양아치) – 2:53
 Memories of a Beach (해변의 추억) – 4:03
 Road (길) – 1:52
 Gangsters (건달들) – 2:28
 War on Crime Part 2 (범죄와의 전쟁 Part 2) – 2:16
 Pedigree (족보) – 2:48
 Road of the War – 1:45
 Crossroad (교차로) – 2:38
 Target (타겟) – 2:15
 To Another World (또 다른 세상으로) – 3:02
 Cold Wall (차가운 벽) – 1:33
 God of Lobbying (로비의 신) – 2:03
 War on Crime Part 3 (범죄와의 전쟁 Part 3) – 4:10
 Profitable Suggestion (유익한 제안) – 2:52
 Dead-end Road (막다른 길) – 2:05
 War on Crime Part 4 (범죄와의 전쟁 Part 4) – 5:49
 Sun Filled (태양은 가득히) – 1:54
 In My Soul of Souls – 4:21
 War on Crime Part 5 (범죄와의 전쟁 Part 5) – 2:44
 I Heard a Rumor (풍문으로 들었소) – 3:16

Reception 
Nameless Gangster attracted over 4 million admissions in 26 days of release. It drew 1 million in four days, 2.5 million in 11 days, 3 million in 17 days, and 3.5 million in 20 days. According to data provided by Korean Film Council (KOFIC) it topped the list of ten most-watched films in South Korea in the first quarter of 2012, with a total of 4.6 million admissions.

Its success is notable as it was screened in February (traditionally a low season for movies), rated R, and screened less frequently due to its long running time of 133 minutes. Korean Film Biz Zone stated "the film has elements working against it for box office success. Despite that, "the return of" Choi Min-sik melded with top-rated actor of the day Ha Jung-woo is impressive. The two actors' presence is backed up by a solid supporting cast, giving the film a distinct flavor of a gangster classic."

The film ranked #1 for three weeks, two of which were consecutive. It grossed  in its first week of release, and grossed a total of  after nine weeks of screening.

On review aggregation website Rotten Tomatoes the film has 4 reviews, all are positive.

In popular culture 
The film spawned many memorable scenes and lines and has been parodied in many popular variety shows on TV, such as Gag Concert and Infinite Challenge. Comedians would mimick the film characters' hairstyle and fashion and the phrase  (akin to meaning 'fresh') used by Choi Min-sik's character. The song "I Heard a Rumor" also became popular. It was also parodied by members of the boy band Shinhwa in their  2013 Shinhwa Grand Finale: The Classic in Seoul concerts in August 2013.

The overt use of the Busan dialect in dialogs, particularly by gangsters and their associates, gained much attention and increased viewers' interest in regional dialects. The use of regional dialect has historically been frowned upon and viewed as being "backwards", especially in media and broadcasting, and the Seoul dialect is the standard and prestige dialect. Most of the lead and supporting actors portraying the gangsters, aside from Cho Jin-woong, were not from the Busan metropolitan area and had to learn the dialect from scratch for several months prior to filming. Choi and his co-star Ha Jung-woo later compared learning the dialect to learning a foreign language.

Awards and nominations

References

External links 
  
 
 
 

2012 films
2010s crime drama films
South Korean crime thriller films
Films about organized crime in South Korea
Films set in 1982
Films set in 1985
Films set in 1987
Films set in 1990
Films set in 2012
Films set in Busan
Films shot in Busan
South Korean gangster films
South Korean crime action films
Films directed by Yoon Jong-bin
Showbox films
2010s Korean-language films
2012 drama films
Yakuza films
Grand Prize Paeksang Arts Award (Film) winners
2010s Japanese films
2010s South Korean films